Captain David Ropes (died 1781) was a notable American Privateer from Salem, Massachusetts who fought in numerous naval battles during the American Revolution. He was taken prisoner twice during the war and then killed in the Battle off Halifax (1782).

Career 
On 14 August 1778, Ropes became the commander of the Schooner Lively (14 guns, 40 men).  He was captured off Jeddore, Nova Scotia by the armed sloops Howe on 10 November 1778.

Six months later, on 22 May 1779, he became the commander of the Brigantine Wildcat (12 guns, 65 men).  On 14 June he chased a Brig and drove it ashore.  In August, 1779, the Wild Cat was taken by Robuste (64 guns) and Ropes was brought to Newfoundland and imprisoned.

The following year, on 9 September 1780, Ropes became the commander of the schooner Dolphin (8 guns, 20 men).

On 14 March 1781, Ropes became the commander of the ship Congress (20 guns, 130 men).  On 1 July 1781, Ropes was taken prisoner along with 20 men  in a battle with the British HM Frigate Oiseau (Bird), under the command of Captain Henry Lloyd, and carried into St. John's, Newfoundland.  Ropes was released and arrive in Boston on 15 August.

On 16 September 1781, Ropes became commander of the ship Jack (14 guns, 60 men).  He fell in with the British brigantine Observer (12 guns, 173 men) off of Halifax, Nova Scotia on June 29, 1782.  The British killed Ropes by the first broadside and then half the crew before the Lieutenant William Gray surrendered the ship.

His son was Captain Joseph Ropes.

See also 
Nova Scotia in the American Revolution

References 

1781 deaths
United States Navy personnel of the American Revolution
American privateers
American Revolutionary War prisoners of war held by Great Britain
History of Nova Scotia
People from Salem, Massachusetts